West Hatch High School is a secondary school located in Chigwell, Epping Forest, Essex (near Woodford Bridge). The area now occupied by West Hatch was previously the western gate (or hatch as it would have been known) into Epping Forest; it is from these roots that the school derives its name. The school currently educates 1,300 students from the local catchment area, and nearly 200 sixth form pupils from north east London and west Essex.

History 
The school was built in 1957 as a four-storied building with glazing on all sides on Chigwell High Road by Richard Sheppard & Partners with the Essex county architect, H. Conolly. The grounds have been renovated on numerous occasions developing the many-acre site into seven main teaching buildings.

Facilities 
West Hatch has been under major renovations recently, including a Music Suite (2002), Maths Dining & Drama Block (1999), Ruby Theatre (2000 built by students attaining Gold The Duke of Edinburgh Award Status), Sixth Form Centre (2000), Business and Enterprise Block (2003) technology, Science block, Design and Technology block and the 4-storey classroom block.

Renovation of the ICT infrastructure has enabled evening classes and Microsoft Digital Literacy training for parents using a parent portal. There is now currently a new sports hall and classroom block being built as an extension to the school.

Notable former pupils 
 Jonathan and Charlotte – Britain's Got Talent finalists
 Vicki Michelle – actress
 Sally Gunnell – Olympic gold medallist
 Kate Silverton – BBC newsreader 
 Mark Wallinger – artist
 Joey Essex – reality TV personality
Charlotte Jaconelli - Actress, Singer,Britains Got Talent Finalist
 Richard Jones – Britain's Got Talent winner
 Nancy Sorrell – model, actress, television presenter
 Sonny Jay - Capital Breakfast host and Britain’s Got Talent finalist

References

External links 
 

Academies in Essex
Educational institutions established in 1957
Secondary schools in Essex
1957 establishments in England
Buildings and structures in Chigwell